In linguistics, a protologism is a word coined, by an individual or a small group, but not yet published independently of the coiner(s). The word may be proposed, may be extremely new, or may not be established outside a very limited group of people. A protologism becomes a neologism as soon as it appears in published press, on a website, or in a book, independently of the coiner. A word whose developmental stage is between that of a protologism (freshly coined) and a neologism (a new word) is a prelogism.

Overview
Protologisms constitute one stage in the development of neologisms. A protologism is coined to fill a gap in the language, with the hope of its becoming an accepted word. As an example, when the word protologism itself was coined—in 2003 by the American literary theorist Mikhail Epstein—it was autological: an example of the thing it describes.

About the concept and his name for it, Epstein wrote:

According to Epstein, every word in use started out as a protologism, subsequently became a neologism, and then gradually grew to be part of the language.

There is no fixed rule determining when a protologism becomes a stable neologism,  and according to Kerry Maxwell, author of Brave New Words:

See also 

 Hapax legomenon, a word occurring only once in a given context, such as in the works of a particular author
 Neologism, a relatively recent or isolated term, word, or phrase that may be in the process of entering common use, but that has not yet been fully accepted into mainstream language.
 Nonce word, a word created for a single occasion
 Sniglet, a humorous word made up to describe something for which no dictionary word exists

Notes

References

Further reading

External links 

 List of protologisms 
 List of protologisms by topic 

2000s neologisms
Lexicology
Terminology
 
Linguistic theories and hypotheses
Literary theory
Linguistic morphology